John Farr Simmons (January 3, 1892 – January 1, 1968) was an American diplomat who served as Chief of Protocol of the United States from 1950 to 1957. He also served as the U.S. Ambassador to Ecuador and El Salvador in the late 1940s.

Career
As a career Foreign Service Officer, Simmons was appointed as the U.S. Ambassador to El Salvador on September 21, 1944. He presented his credentials on February 21, 1945, and remained in the position for more than two years until he was chosen to become U.S. Ambassador to Ecuador. He left El Salvador on July 1, 1947, and arrived in Ecuador later that month. He left the post on July 12, 1950.

Just over a week later, on July 21, 1950, Simmons was named to become Chief of Protocol at the U.S. State Department under President Harry S. Truman. He took office on August 18, 1950, and retained his role under President Dwight D. Eisenhower. He left the position on January 31, 1957.

References

1892 births
1968 deaths
Chiefs of Protocol of the United States
Ambassadors of the United States to Ecuador
Ambassadors of the United States to El Salvador